Moonee is a coastal suburb of the Central Coast region of New South Wales, Australia. It is part of the  local government area.

Moonee is largely unpopulated, with nearly all of its land area being part of the Munmorah State Conservation Area. In the west of the area is the decommissioned Moonee Colliery.

Suburbs of the Central Coast (New South Wales)